CIPET: Central Institute of Petrochemical Engineering and Technology, Jaipur is an autonomous higher education and research institute located in Jaipur, India. It was established in 2006 under the aegis of the Ministry of Chemical and Fertilizers, Government of India.

Location 
CIPET Jaipur is located on a 17.29-acre campus at SP - 1298, Sitapura Industrial Area, Near Mahatma Gandhi Hospital, Jaipur.

Courses 
•B.Tech in Mechanical Engineering

•B.Tech in Plastic Technology

•B.Tech in Petrochemical Engineering

•Diploma in Plastic Technology

References

External links 
• Official website of cipet

• CIPET Jaipur in Google Map

2006 establishments in Rajasthan